Fai Chi Kei is a place located in Nossa Senhora de Fátima, Macau. It was originally a sandbank near the peninsula. The area is bounded by Rua da Bacia Sul, Avenida Marginal do Lam Mau, Rua da Doca Seca and Rua Sul do Patane.

History
The quarter was constructed in there in 1932, then known as the "May 28th Houses" in commemoration of the Portuguese Reformation Day.

The two-storey buildings stood in two lines on top of rectangular foundations with chopsticks shape, hence the name "Fai Chi Kei" in Cantonese.

Later, the original houses were rebuilt to become a public rental housing project surrounded by reclaimed land. Designed by Manuel Vicente, the complex was supposed to be four buildings, but instead two 6-storey complexes were built with an inner courtyard.

Redevelopment
The housing project has since disappeared and demolished to make way for The Praia, a large residential development.

Healthcare
The Macau government operates a public health centre in Santo António, near Bairro Fai Chi Kei.

References

External links

Location of Fai Chi Kei in Macau map
 The Praia
 Diagram of buildings

Macau Peninsula
Buildings and structures in Macau
History of Macau
1932 establishments in Macau